Port Sudan is a port city in eastern Sudan, and the capital of the state of Red Sea. , it has 489,725 residents. Located on the Red Sea, Port Sudan is recognized as Sudan's main seaport and the source of 90% of the country's international trade.

History 
Port Sudan was built between 1905 and 1909 by the administration of Anglo-Egyptian Sudan to replace Suakin. An oil pipeline was built between the port and Khartoum in 1977.

In 2009, Israel allegedly used naval commandos to attack Iranian arms ships at Port Sudan as part of Operation Birds of Prey.

In 2020, Russian president Vladimir Putin announced that the Russian Navy would begin construction on a base with capacity for 300 personnel and four warships in Port Sudan. The facility would prove Russia with a naval base in the nation for at least 25 years. The plan was ultimately suspended, though Sudanese leadership indicated that it is possible for the construction to go forward in the future.

Following the October–November 2021 Sudanese coup d'état, the Beja tribal council initiated a weeklong blockade of the city's ports. Following negotiations with military officials, the blockade was lifted.

Economy

The city has an oil refinery and handles 90% of the country's international trade. Major exports include oilseed, senna, and hides and skins. Imports include construction materials, heavy machinery, and vehicles.

Transport
The city has a modern container-port to handle imports and exports. The port is part of the 21st Century Maritime Silk Road that runs from the Chinese coast via the Suez Canal to the Mediterranean, there to the Upper Adriatic region of Trieste with its rail connections to Central and Eastern Europe.

The main airport is Port Sudan New International Airport. There is now a tarred road linking Port Sudan to Khartoum via Atbara. Port Sudan also has a rail link with Khartoum. There is also an international ferry from Jeddah.

Education

The city is home to the Red Sea University, established in 1994.

Places of worship    
Places of worship are predominantly Muslim mosques, but there are also Christian churches and temples including the Roman Catholic Archdiocese of Khartoum (Catholic Church), Sudan Interior Church (Baptist World Alliance), and Presbyterian Church in Sudan (World Communion of Reformed Churches).

Climate
Port Sudan has a hot desert climate (Köppen: BWh) with extremely hot summers and moderately hot winters, requiring the acquisition of fresh water from Wadi Arba'at in the Red Sea Hills and from salt-evaporating pans.

Demographics

The population consists mainly of Sudanese Arabs, including the native Beja people, with small Asian and European minorities.

Notable people 

 Gawaher (Pop singer)
 Ra'ouf Mus'ad (Playwright)

Notes

References 
 Arckell, A. J., UNESCO General History of Africa, History of Darfur 1200-1700 A.D. SNR.
 Encyclopædia Britannica, "Port Sudan" (description), 2007, webpage: EB-PortSudan.

External links 
 

 
Populated coastal places in Sudan
Populated places in Red Sea (state)
Port cities in Sudan
Underwater diving sites of Sudan
Port cities and towns of the Red Sea
Populated places established in 1905
State capitals in Sudan
1905 establishments in the British Empire
1905 establishments in Africa